Viking (formerly Viking Cruises) is a cruise line providing river, ocean, and expedition cruises. Its operating headquarters are in Basel, Switzerland, and its marketing headquarters are in Los Angeles, California.

The company has three divisions, Viking River Cruises, Viking Ocean Cruises, and Viking Expeditions. As of February 2020, it operates a fleet of 76 river vessels and six ocean ships, offering cruises along the rivers and oceans of North and South America, the Caribbean, Europe, Russia, Egypt, China, and Southeast Asia.

History

Development 
The company was established by Torstein Hagen in St. Petersburg, Russia as Viking River Cruises in 1997. Hagen had become involved in cruising as a McKinsey and Company consultant who helped the Holland America Line survive the 1973 oil crisis, then was CEO of the Royal Viking Line from 1980 to 1984, made money in the Russian private equity markets, then bought a controlling stake in a Dutch shipping company that failed in the mid-1990s, leaving him almost bankrupt. In 1997, Hagen helped some Russian oligarchs buy a shipping company, and in exchange, they sold him four river cruise ships cheaply, which became the founding fleet of Viking River Cruises.

1997–2010: Rapid expansion 
In 2000, Viking purchased KD River Cruises of Europe, which brought Viking's fleet total to 26, making it the largest river cruising fleet in the world. The company revamped the ships, aiming for its target demographic of older North Americans. The lack of frills, like gyms and pools, and the fleet's standardization also maximized the number of people the ships could accommodate and consequently, Viking's profit.  Also that year, the company partnered with sales agents in the UK, and the US, and opened its own sales office in California. It hired its first marketing firm the next year, focusing on North America. The company expanded into China in 2004 with Yangtze River cruises. By 2007, it was operating 23 ships in Europe, Russia, and China. In 2009, Viking started to use ships with hybrid diesel-electric engines that the company claims use an estimated 20% less fuel than conventional engines.

2011–2019: Growth and modernization 
In 2011, the company planned a new phase of growth, started sponsoring PBS's Masterpiece Theatre, and made plans to add 40 ships of a new "longship" design to its fleet over a five-year period. The longship design maximized passenger capacity by squaring the bow and rearranging hallways. It christened 10 ships in one day in 2013, and the 16 ships it christened over two days in 2014 made the Guinness Book of World Records.  By 2013, the company had spent around $400 million in marketing through direct mailing, television, the web, and trade marketing. In May 2013, the company modified its name from Viking River Cruises to Viking Cruises as it announced the launch of Viking Ocean Cruises, a division of small, oceangoing vessels.

In October 2017, Viking Cruises revealed it was working on a project to develop the world's first cruise ship powered by liquid hydrogen. The ship would share a similar design to the company's existing oceangoing vessels.

By 2018, Viking Cruises had reached $3 billion in revenue and carried 440,000 passengers annually, employing more than 8,000 employees. That year, Viking Cruises announced it was working on its debut in the North American river cruising market after first suggesting the possibility in 2013. The company targeted a possible 2021 debut on the Mississippi River, for a projection of six vessels along the river by 2027. The vessels, built and chartered by Edison Chouest, would be designed five stories tall and accommodate around 400 passengers, at $90 million to $100 million each. Cruises would travel between New Orleans and Memphis, and between St. Louis and Saint Paul.

2020–present: Rebranding and new ventures 
In January 2020, the company shortened its name to Viking, citing the brand's added emphasis on destination-oriented enrichment and experiences. That same year, Viking also announced the launch of Viking Expeditions with a planned January 2022 debut. It would become the expeditions arm of the brand and operate small-ship trips to exotic destinations. It also finalized its river cruising business' expansion plans into the United States with the announcement of the first vessel's debut in August 2022 on the Mississippi River.

River cruises

Viking River Cruises offers cruising along the rivers of Europe, Russia, China, Southeast Asia and Egypt, with plans to expand into the United States of America along the Mississippi River in 2022. Viking's European ships have an average capacity of 190 passengers; its Russian ships' capacity averages just over 200 and its China ship carries up to 256. As of 2019, Viking River Cruises operated a fleet of 76 owned and charted vessels.

Fleet

Chartered ships

Future ships

Former Fleet

Ocean cruises
The Viking Ocean Cruises division was formed in 2013. It began operating its first vessel, Viking Star, in 2015, with itineraries in Scandinavia, the British Isles, the Baltic and Mediterranean Sea. Viking Sea joined the fleet in 2016; and its third and fourth ships, Viking Sky and Viking Sun, were added in 2017. Each of Viking Ocean Cruises first four vessels were named after the first four vessels of Royal Viking Line, whom Viking Cruises founder Torstein Hagen was CEO of from 1980 to 1985.

In June 2018, Viking's fifth ocean vessel, Viking Orion, was added to the fleet. Being one-third the size of many cruise ships being built by major cruise lines, this allows the Viking Star-class  to enter into smaller ports. Its overall length is 745.4 ft. (227.2 m); its beam is 94.5 ft. (28.8 m); the draft is 20.7 ft. (6.3 m); with a gross tonnage of 47,800 GT. The four ships were built by Fincantieri shipyard in Ancona, Italy, and the Scandinavian influenced, modernist interior design was developed by London-based SMC Design and Los Angeles–based Rottet Studio.

Viking's itineraries feature travel in Northern Europe, the Baltic, the Americas, the Caribbean, the Mediterranean, Asia, Australia and New Zealand. Their ships spend more time in port than is common at other ocean lines, emphasizing a focus on the culture of their destinations. Viking Ocean Cruises' vessels carry up to 930 passengers and 550 crew.

In 2017-2018, Viking Sun made the company's first round-the-world cruise, which departed from Miami, and sailed south to head through the Panama Canal, and planned to visit five continents, 35 countries and 64 ports before ending its 141-day journey in London. In May 2018, Viking Cruises announced its intention to launch a new package called Ultimate World Cruise, which it claimed to be the longest continuous world cruise itinerary in history. Its most expensive package will cover 245 days on Viking Sun and will stop at 59 countries and 113 ports.

Fleet

Future ships 

{| class="wikitable"
! Ship || Maiden Voyage || Builder || Length || Gross Tonnage || Planned Flag ||  Planned Staterooms || Planned Passengers
|-
| Viking Saturn||align=center| 2023 ||align=center| Fincantieri ||align="Center" | 227 m || align=center| 47,842 tons ||align="Center" |  ||align="Center"| 465 ||align="Center"| 930
|-
! colspan="8" |Enlarged Hydrogen-Fuel Cell Ocean Ships (beginning 2024)
|-
| TBA|| align="center" | 2024 || align="center" | Fincantieri|| align="Center" | 238 m || align="center" | TBD || align="Center" |  || align="Center" | 490 || align="Center" | TBD
|-
| TBA|| align="center" | 2025 || align="center" | Fincantieri|| align="Center" | 238 m || align="center" | TBD || align="Center" |  || align="Center" | 490 || align="Center" | TBD
|-
| TBA|| align="center" | 2025 || align="center" | Fincantieri|| align="Center" | 238 m || align="center" | TBD || align="Center" |  || align="Center" | 490 || align="Center" | TBD
|-
| TBA|| align="center" | 2026 || align="center" | Fincantieri|| align="Center" | 238 m || align="center" | TBD || align="Center" |  || align="Center" | 490 || align="Center" | TBD
|-
| TBA|| align="center" | 2026 || align="center" | Fincantieri|| align="Center" | 238 m || align="center" | TBD || align="Center" |  || align="Center" | 490 || align="Center" | TBD
|-
| TBA|| align="center" | 2027 || align="center" | Fincantieri|| align="Center" | 238 m || align="center" | TBD || align="Center" |  || align="Center" | 490 || align="Center" | TBD
|-
| TBA|| align="center" | 2028 || align="center" | Fincantieri|| align="Center" | 238 m || align="center" | TBD || align="Center" |  || align="Center" | 490 || align="Center" | TBD
|-
| TBA|| align="center" | 2028 || align="center" | Fincantieri || align="Center" | 238 m || align="center" | TBD || align="Center" |  || align="Center" | 490 || align="Center" | TBD
|}

 China Merchants Viking Cruises 

Expedition cruises
In April 2018, Viking Cruises and VARD announced Viking had signed a contract to order two "special" cruise ships from VARD that are expected to enter service in 2021 and 2022, with an option for two more. Planned to be built in Romania and Norway, the value of the contract was estimated to be worth around 5 billion Norwegian krone (about $611 million). The ships were expected to be expedition vessels.

In October 2019, it was first reported that Viking Cruises was planning to launch Viking Expeditions, the expeditions arm to the business, in early 2020, with initial itineraries focusing on the polar regions of the Arctic Circle and Antarctica. In January 2020, Viking officially announced the launch of Viking Expeditions. Expedition trips would be performed on smaller vessels designed to navigate through smaller waterways while also being capable of travelling through sea, and reach destinations such as polar regions and North America’s Great Lakes. Scheduled to begin operating its first vessel in January 2022, named Viking Octantis, and its second in August, named Viking Polaris, Viking Expeditions will also partner with scientists from the National Oceanic and Atmospheric Administration (NOAA) to conduct research along with its own expedition team.

 Fleet 

 Chartered ships 

 Sponsorships 
Since 2011, Viking has sponsored programming on PBS's Masterpiece Theatre, including Downton Abbey, Sherlock and Poldark, and is a sponsor of National Geographic's Genius, a scripted series about the life of Albert Einstein. Viking has also sponsored the Los Angeles Philharmonic at The Hollywood Bowl, Metropolitan Opera, BBC, Munch Museum in Oslo, Norway, and Mariinsky Theatre in St. Petersburg, Russia.

 Accidents and incidents 

On 11 September 2016, Viking Freya collided with a bridge near to Erlangen, Germany, crushing the wheelhouse and killing two crew members.

On 23 March 2019, Viking Sky put out a mayday call after she suffered an engine failure off the coast of Norway. Six of Norway’s fourteen rescue helicopters were sent to the scene, and 460 passengers were evacuated before the ship travelled to Molde under her own power. The vessel was attached to a tugboat as the anchors were inoperable. On 27 March, Viking Sky arrived at a shipyard in Kristiansund for repairs. The next scheduled cruise was cancelled.

On 1 April 2019, Viking Idun collided with the oil tanker Chemical Marketer (IMO 9304291) in Terneuzen, in the Netherlands, not far from Antwerp. Five passengers were slightly injured; one crew member was taken to hospital. The Marine Insurance report indicates that the Idun "suffered considerable damage to her bow" while the tanker "suffered several breaches to her hull".

On 29 May 2019, Viking Sigyn, during a sightseeing tour on the Danube, collided with a small tour boat, the Hableány, in Budapest, Hungary. Hableány sank with 35 people on board of whom 28 died. On 11 June 2019, the boat was recovered from the riverbed and deposited on a barge by a floating crane. The captain of the Viking Sigyn, identified as Yuriy C. and later as Yuriy Chaplinsky from  Odessa, Ukraine, was arrested and held in custody on suspicion of endangering water transport and causing a mass-casualty incident. He was released on bail on 11 June 2019. According to Viking Cruises, Chaplinsky was also aboard the Viking Idun at the time of 1 April 2019 incident but was not acting as captain of that vessel at the time it collided with the oil tanker. Other reports stated that, according to Hungarian prosecutors he was, in fact, the captain of the Idun during the incident near Terneuzen. The Dutch Safety Board would not reveal the identity of captain of the ship during 1 April incident to the news media. A report from Hungary in mid October stated that the captain of the Sigyn, Yuriy Chaplinsky, was not impaired at the time of the crash and was on the bridge in control of the vessel. The Captain had stated that he "simply did not notice" the tour boat. Although news reports stated that he was not to "blame" for the crash, Captain Chaplinsky remained under pre-trial arrest as a suspect in "endangering water transport resulting in a fatal mass catastrophe and of failing to offer aid at the time of the crash", according to CBS News.

On the evening of 5 June 2019, a Viking ship, initially said to be the Viking Var, damaged the lock of Riedenburg, in the Rhine–Main–Danube Canal. After the impact, the lock could not be properly closed. No one was injured in the accident. The repair was expected to take two to three weeks to complete. Witnesses later indicated the vessel involved in that incident was actually Viking Tir. 

On 29 November 2022, the Viking Polaris'' was hit by a rogue wave during a storm off the coast of Argentina. A glass screen was shattered and a female passenger was killed by flying glass. Four other people were injured.

See also
 List of river cruise ships

References

External links 

 

Cruise lines
River cruise companies
Expedition cruising
Shipping companies of the United States
Companies based in Los Angeles
Companies based in Basel
Privately held companies based in California
American companies established in 1997
Woodland Hills, Los Angeles